Sir James Duncan Dunbar-Nasmith    (born 15 March 1927) is a British conservation architect.

He was born in Devon, the son of Admiral Sir Martin Dunbar-Nasmith,  (1883–1965) and Beatrix Justina Dunbar-Dunbar-Rivers . His elder brother was Rear-Admiral David Dunbar-Nasmith,  (1921–1997). He was educated at Lockers Park School, Winchester College and Trinity College, Cambridge.

Dunbar-Nasmith is best known as the architect of Sunninghill Park, the former home of The Duke of York, and Balmoral Estate architect. He is in professional practice as a partner in Law & Dunbar-Nasmith, architects, Edinburgh (since 1957), and Hilger, Law & Dunbar-Nasmith, architects, Wiesbaden (since 1993).

He was Professor and Head of the Department of Architecture at Heriot-Watt University, Edinburgh, and the Edinburgh College of Art, 1978–1988, and is now Emeritus Professor at Heriot Watt University.

Honours
He was made a CBE in 1976, and knighted in 1996.

References

External links
LDN Architects LLP
The Scottish Civic Trust
Biography and photo

Living people
1927 births
People from Totnes
Architects from Devon
20th-century English architects
Fellows of the Royal Institute of British Architects
Commanders of the Order of the British Empire
Knights Bachelor
Academics of Heriot-Watt University
Conservation architects
Alumni of the Edinburgh College of Art